John Joseph McHale (September 21, 1921 – January 17, 2008) was an American professional baseball player and executive. He played in Major League Baseball (MLB) as a first baseman for the Detroit Tigers during the 1940s, and later served as the general manager of the Tigers, Milwaukee / Atlanta Braves, and Montreal Expos. He was the first president and executive director of the Expos during their maiden years in the National League, and owned ten percent of the team. His son John McHale Jr. became an MLB executive vice president.

Detroit Tigers' player and executive
McHale was born in the city of Detroit, Michigan, and attended Detroit Catholic Central High School (Class of 1938) and the University of Notre Dame. He signed with his hometown Tigers in 1941 and two years later made his first MLB appearance. In five seasons and 64 games with the Tigers (1943–45, 1947–48), McHale compiled a batting average of .193 with 22 hits. He was hitless in three at bats in the 1945 World Series, in which Detroit defeated the Chicago Cubs. Defensively, he recorded a .995 fielding percentage as a first baseman with only one error in 214 total chances.

After the 1948 season, McHale, who had recently married a niece of team owner Walter Briggs Sr., retired from the field for a job in the Tiger front office as assistant farm system director. In 1953, he became director of minor league operations for the Tigers and was named general manager early in the  season at the young age of 35. But after less than two full seasons, he was recruited by the defending NL champion Braves, where he succeeded John J. Quinn as general manager in January . Three years later, he added the title of club president.

Career in Milwaukee and Atlanta
As it turned out, McHale presided over the slow decline of the Braves on the field. While superstar Hank Aaron was in the prime of his career, eventual Hall of Famers Warren Spahn and Eddie Mathews—along with Del Crandall, Lew Burdette, Joe Adcock and other stars of the Braves' 1957–58 NL championship clubs—aged and fell off in production. Meanwhile, the young players developed by the team's farm system could not pick up the slack. However, according to an April 8, 1963 article in Sports Illustrated, it was McHale himself who disposed of young talent and decimated the farm system: "With General Manager John McHale trading away brilliant young pitchers (Joey Jay and Juan Pizarro) and solid everyday performers like Billy Bruton and Joe Adcock, and then unloading over half the once fertile farm clubs, Bragan will have to depend on old Braves who may prefer peace to war."

As the Braves slipped into the middle ranks of the National League, attendance at Milwaukee County Stadium declined precipitously. In , the club was sold to a group of Chicago-based investors. By , the Braves were rumored (correctly) to be moving to Atlanta. In , during their lame-duck season in Milwaukee, McHale was the figurehead for a supremely unpopular ownership.

In , the Atlanta Braves' first year, the club started slowly. McHale was replaced as general manager in mid-season by Paul Richards, a former Tiger teammate of McHale's and a legend in Georgia's capital since his days as playing manager of the Atlanta Crackers of the  Southern Association from 1938 to 1942. After the season, McHale left the Braves to replace Lee MacPhail as the chief aide to Baseball Commissioner William Eckert.

Candidacy for Baseball Commissioner
In , the year before the National League expanded to 12 teams, McHale was named president of the newly born Montreal Expos by their owner, Seagrams heir Charles Bronfman. A few weeks after McHale's appointment, Eckert was fired as commissioner and McHale emerged as a leading contender to succeed his former boss, along with executives Michael Burke of the New York Yankees and Chub Feeney of the San Francisco Giants.

He had strong support in the American League, but NL owners—who wanted McHale's experienced hand turned toward the fledgling Expo franchise—intervened and McHale's candidacy was halted. (The commissionership eventually went to National League attorney Bowie Kuhn).

Founding president of the Montréal Expos
Putting the commissioner election behind him, McHale focused on building the first MLB franchise located in Canada. McHale resigned as general manager in favor of Murray Cook at the close of the  season. He announced on September 5, 1986 becoming Expos deputy chairman upon his retirement as president and chief operating officer effective October 1. Claude Brochu succeeded him in both capacities. McHale remained as the team's chief executive officer until December 31, 1987.

McHale was also the last non-Hall of Fame member of the Hall's Veterans Committee, having been grandfathered in when the structure of the committee was updated in 2001. He died in Stuart, Florida, at age 86.

References

Further reading
Baseball Hall of Fame - 2008 Veterans Committee candidate profile via Wayback Machine
Toronto Star Obituary 2008
Bloomberg Obituary 2008

External links

1921 births
2008 deaths
Baseball players from Detroit
Beaumont Exporters players
Buffalo Bisons (minor league) players
Canadian Baseball Hall of Fame inductees
Detroit Tigers executives
Detroit Tigers players
Major League Baseball executives
Major League Baseball farm directors
Major League Baseball first basemen
Major League Baseball general managers
Major League Baseball team presidents
Milwaukee Braves executives
Montreal Expos executives
Muskegon Reds players
Notre Dame Fighting Irish baseball players
University of Notre Dame alumni
Winston-Salem Twins players
Detroit Catholic Central High School alumni